Asociación Civil Hurlingham Club, simply known as "Hurlingham Club" is an Argentine sports and social club located in the city of Hurlingham, Buenos Aires. It is named after the Hurlingham Club in London and was set up in 1888 by the local Anglo-Argentine community. The town of Hurlingham and Hurlingham Partido grew up around the club, taking its name.

The club hosts a wide range of activities, such as cricket, gymnastics, golf, horse riding, polo, squash, and tennis. The "Abierto de Hurlingham" (Hurlingham Open) polo tournament is considered the 2nd. in importance after the Campeonato Argentino.

The club covers 73 hectares and has an 18-hole golf course, five polo fields, stables for 300 horses, schools of polo, horse riding and pony riding, 18 tennis courts including six grass courts, a cricket pitch, two swimming pools, three paddle tennis courts and an indoor complex with a gym, squash court and dressing rooms.

The club house also has elegant function rooms, restaurant and bars, plus hotel rooms available to members.

Hurlingham was the first place in Argentina where polo was played, and the Argentine Polo Association was founded at the club in 1922. Argentina has subsequently become a dominant power in international polo, and the club hosts a major polo tournament each year, the "Campeonato Abierto de Hurlingham".

History 
At the end of the 19th century there were very few institutions where one could practise sports in Buenos Aires. Due to the construction of the railway lines in Argentina, many British citizen had established in Argentina, forming a big community that founded social and sports clubs where British sports could be practised, such as bowls, cricket, football, golf, horse riding, rugby union and tennis amongst others.

John Ravenscroft, an Englishman living in the rural village of Puan, Buenos Aires, wanted to join the British community of Argentina to practise all the sports in a same place. He inspired in the London Hurlingham Club (that ruled polo worldwide) to create a similar institution in Argentina.

In 1888 Ravenscroft got the funds and called a meeting, attended by John Campbell, John Drysdale, John Ravenscroft, John Drysdale (nephew), Hugh Scott Robson, B.W. Gardom, David Methven, Edward Casey, Alexander Hume y David Bankier, who wrote the statute of "Sociedad Anónima Hurlingham Club". The statute was later sent to the Government for its approval, which was given by then President of Argentina Miguel Juárez Celman on 22 November 1888.

Ravenscroft wished to have the club located in the district of Belgrano, Buenos Aires, but the owners of the available lands increased their costs considerably enough to dismiss the idea. Other neighborhoods where the recently formed club tried to place were Flores, Chacarita, Villa Devoto (all of them in the city of Buenos Aires) even trying Vicente López Partido in Greater Buenos Aires, with no successful results. The final solution came from Mr. Hill, then General Manager of the Buenos Aires and Pacific Railway and a cricket enthusiast, who promised to help the club to find a land where to establish its headquarters and fields.

The club was finally located in a land placed next to the Pacific railway tracks. The only way to access the club was on horseback, due to there were no pavement roads by then in Buenos Aires. During the first years of existence of the club, the members coming to Hurlingham by train, asked the motorman to stop in front of the club to up and down passengers. The railway station would be built some years later.

On 6 January 1890 the first cricket match was held in Hurlingham Club. At the end of 1889 the club sent Pacific Railway a request to build a station close to the club. The railway company satisfied the demand and the station was opened in 1890, with a daily service to Palermo.

In June 1892 the first golf tournament was played at Hurlingham. One year later it was played, the first game of which is considered the oldest championship in the world, the "Abierto de Hurlingham". In 1910 the club suspended horse racing definitely, due to a law promulgated by the National Government of Argentina forbidding the races on weekdays.

Honours

Cricket
Primera División (14):
 1900-01, 1903-04, 1912-13, 1913-14, 1920-21, 1921-22, 1934-35, 1982-83, 1985-86, 1986-87, 1987-88, 1993-94, 1996-97, 2007-08

Polo 
 Abierto Argentino (15): 1893 (Apr), 1893 (Oct), 1897, 1899, 1902, 1903, 1905, 1918, 1920, 1921, 1925, 1926, 1927, 1929, 1937

Notes

References

External links

 

Cricket grounds in Argentina
Multi-sport clubs in Argentina
Polo clubs in Argentina
1888 establishments in Argentina
Sports clubs established in 1888
 
Golf clubs and courses in Argentina
Hurlingham, Buenos Aires
Venues of the 2018 Summer Youth Olympics

de:Hurlingham Club